Guiglia (Frignanese:  or ) is a comune (municipality) in the Province of Modena in the Italian region Emilia-Romagna, located about  southwest of Bologna and about  south of Modena.

Guiglia borders the following municipalities: Valsamoggia, Marano sul Panaro, Pavullo nel Frignano, Savignano sul Panaro, Zocca.

Among its churches is San Geminiano, Guiglia and San Giovanni Battista, Pieve di Trebbio.

References

External links
 Official website

Cities and towns in Emilia-Romagna